Mississippi Mills is a town in eastern Ontario, Canada, in Lanark County on the Mississippi River. It is made up of the former Townships of Ramsay and Pakenham, as well as the Town of Almonte. It is partly located within Canada's National Capital Region.

History 
The Town of Mississippi Mills was incorporated on January 1, 1998, by amalgamating the town of Almonte with the townships of Ramsay and Pakenham.

Almonte's first settler was David Shepherd, who in 1819 was granted  by the Crown to build and operate a mill. The site became known as Shepherd's Falls. That name was never official, however, as Shepherd sold his patent after his mill burned down. The buyer of the patent, Daniel Shipman, rebuilt the mill and the settlement became known as Shipman's Mills in 1820.

The majority of Shipman's Mills' early settlers were Scottish. The town grew to encompass thirty stores and forty other businesses. A textile mill town almost from the start, at its peak it boasted seven busy woolen mills. During this time of rapid expansion the town changed its name from Shipman's Mills to Ramsayville and then to Waterford. When in 1855 the newly created Canadian post office pointed out there was already a Waterford in Ontario, the town needed yet another name change.

Relations between the United States and Great Britain had been antagonistic since the War of 1812. Border skirmishes between Mexico and the United States increased this antagonism. Mexican general Juan Almonte had fought in these skirmishes, and by 1853 had become Mexico's ambassador to the United States. Since the people of Waterford mistrusted the U.S., and General Almonte had resisted the U.S., they decided to honour Mexico and the general by renaming the town Almonte. This makes Almonte the only town in Ontario named after a Mexican general. The name change appears to have happened in 1856, though the post office didn't record the new name until 1859.

After the last textile mill closed in the early 1980s, Almonte no longer had a dominant industry. It has since turned its attention towards tourism. It offers museums and several historical spots, such as the home of James Naismith, the inventor of basketball, and the Naismith Museum & Hall of Fame. Many of the town's residential, commercial and institutional buildings date from the 19th century. Malcolm Street, for example, contains many 19th century homes. Daniel Shipman's house still stands at the corner of Bridge and Mill Streets.

Communities
The town comprises the communities of Almonte, Appleton, Bennies Corners, Blakeney, Cedar Hill, Clayton, Galbraith, McCrearys, Montgomery Park, Pakenham, Ramsay, Snedden, The Tannery, Uneeda, and Union Hall. The town administrative offices are located in Ramsay and Almonte.

The Pakenham area is known for Mount Pakenham, a popular skiing location near Pakenham, and the five-arch stone bridge across the Mississippi River. Built in 1901, it is the only five-arch stone bridge in North America. The community itself is named for Major-General Sir Edward Pakenham, who was killed near the Mississippi River in the southern United States commanding British forces at the Battle of New Orleans in 1815.

Demographics

Culture

Mississippi Mills is home to several festivals and events, including the North Lanark Highland Games, Naismith 3-on-3 Basketball Festival, the Almonte Fair and CeltFest.

Many of the town's citizens commute to the nearby city of Ottawa. Almonte has three elementary schools: R. Tait McKenzie Public School, Naismith Memorial Public School and Holy Name of Mary Catholic School. Almonte and District High School serves the town of Almonte and much of the surrounding area.

See also
List of townships in Ontario
Joseph Yuill

References

External links

Towns in Ontario
Lower-tier municipalities in Ontario
Municipalities in Lanark County